Phytohabitans kaempferiae is a bacterium from the genus Phytohabitans which has been isolated from a leaf of the plant Kaempferia larsenii in Ubon Ratchathani province, Thailand.

References

External links
Type strain of Phytohabitans kaempferiae at BacDive -  the Bacterial Diversity Metadatabase

Micromonosporaceae
Bacteria described in 2016